Jičín District is a district in the Hradec Králové Region of the Czech Republic. Its capital is the town of Jičín.

Administrative division
Jičín District is divided into three administrative districts of municipalities with extended competence: Jičín, Hořice and Nová Paka.

List of municipalities
Towns are marked in bold and market towns in italics:

Bačalky – 
Bašnice – 
Běchary – 
Bílsko u Hořic – 
Boháňka – 
Borek – 
Brada-Rybníček – 
Březina – 
Bříšťany – 
Budčeves – 
Bukvice – 
Butoves – 
Bystřice – 
Cerekvice nad Bystřicí – 
Červená Třemešná – 
Češov – 
Cholenice – 
Chomutice – 
Choteč – 
Chyjice –
Dětenice – 
Dílce – 
Dobrá Voda u Hořic – 
Dolní Lochov – 
Dřevěnice – 
Holín – 
Holovousy – 
Hořice – 
Jeřice – 
Jičín –
Jičíněves – 
Jinolice – 
Kacákova Lhota – 
Kbelnice – 
Kněžnice – 
Konecchlumí – 
Kopidlno – 
Kostelec – 
Kovač – 
Kozojedy – 
Kyje –
Lázně Bělohrad – 
Libáň – 
Libošovice – 
Libuň –  
Lískovice – 
Lukavec u Hořic – 
Lužany – 
Markvartice – 
Miletín – 
Milovice u Hořic – 
Mladějov – 
Mlázovice – 
Nemyčeves – 
Nevratice – 
Nová Paka – 
Ohařice – 
Ohaveč – 
Osek – 
Ostroměř – 
Ostružno – 
Pecka – 
Petrovičky – 
Podhorní Újezd a Vojice – 
Podhradí – 
Podůlší – 
Radim – 
Rašín – 
Rohoznice – 
Rokytňany – 
Samšina – 
Sběř – 
Sedliště – 
Sekeřice – 
Slatiny – 
Slavhostice – 
Sobčice – 
Soběraz – 
Sobotka – 
Stará Paka – 
Staré Hrady – 
Staré Místo – 
Staré Smrkovice – 
Střevač – 
Sukorady – 
Svatojanský Újezd –  
Šárovcova Lhota – 
Tetín – 
Třebnouševes – 
Třtěnice – 
Tuř –
Úbislavice – 
Údrnice – 
Úhlejov – 
Újezd pod Troskami – 
Úlibice – 
Valdice – 
Veliš – 
Vidochov – 
Vitiněves – 
Volanice – 
Vrbice – 
Vršce – 
Vřesník – 
Vysoké Veselí – 
Zámostí-Blata –
Zelenecká Lhota – 
Železnice – 
Žeretice – 
Židovice – 
Žlunice

Geography

The landscape is mainly deforested with flat or slightly undulating terrain, but in the north it turns into a hilly terrain. The territory extends into five geomorphological mesoregions: Jičín Uplands (most of the territory), Giant Mountains Foothills (northeast), East Elbe Table (south), Central Elbe Table (southwest) and Ještěd–Kozákov Ridge (small part in the north).

There are not significant rivers and bodies of water. The longest river is the Cidlina, which crosses the territory from north to south. Another notable rivers in the district are Mrlina and Bystřice.

Bohemian Paradise is the protected landscape area that extends into the district, in its northwestern part.

Demographics

Most populated municipalities

Economy
The largest employers with its headquarters in Jičín District and at least 500 employers are:

In Mladějov is the largest deposit of high-quality glass sand in the Czech Republic.

Transport
There are no motorways passing through the district. The most important road is the I/35 (part of the European route E442) from Liberec to Hradec Králové.

Sights

The most important monuments in the district, protected as national cultural monuments, are:
Humprecht Castle
Kost Castle

The best-preserved settlements, protected as monument reservations and monument zones, are:

Jičín (monument reservation)
Vesec (monument reservation)
Pecka
Sobotka
Železnice
Karlov
Nové Smrkovice
Štidla
Studeňany

The most visited tourist destinations are the Prachov Rocks, Staré Hrady Castle, and Dětenice Castle.

References

External links

Jičín District profile on the Czech Statistical Office's website

 
Districts of the Czech Republic